Theo Glinz (1890–1962) was a Swiss painter.

Glinz was born on 6 September 1890 in Lenzburg, Switzerland. His father was an art teacher in the local school district. He moved to eastern Switzerland in 1915; in 1927 he relocated to Horn.

Selected works
Südliche Landschaft (Southern landscape), oil painting
Die Kirche von Carona (The church of Carona), oil on wood
Grosse Gartenlandschaft (Large garden landscape), oil on plywood
Waldlichtung (Forest clearing), pen and pencil on paper
Altenrhein, oil on plywood
Bad Horn, oil on canvas, 1933
Landschaft bei der Grünau, Horn (Landscape at Grünau, Horn), pen and ink drawing on paper, 1941
Er spricht zu seinem Volk (He speaks to his people), oil on plywood, 1942
Landarbeiter bei der Ruhepause (Agricultural workers at rest), oil on panel, 1947

Literature
Literature by and about Theo Glinz in the catalog of the German National Library

References

20th-century Swiss painters
Swiss male painters
1890 births
1962 deaths
People from Lenzburg
20th-century Swiss male artists